Yumi Natta (born ) is a retired Japanese volleyball player.

She was part of the Japan women's national volleyball team at the 1994 FIVB Volleyball Women's World Championship in Brazil. On club level she played with Daiei.

Clubs
 Daiei (1994)

References

1969 births
Living people
Japanese women's volleyball players
Place of birth missing (living people)
Goodwill Games medalists in volleyball
Competitors at the 1994 Goodwill Games